Oligodon formosanus (Formosa kukri snake or beautiful kukri snake) is a species of snake of the family Colubridae.

This snake is named after its range in Taiwan (Formosa).

Description

The scale colorings range in the brown-red spectrum. The body is a tawny light brown with two darker russet stripes running down either side of the spine, where thin black lines that break into smaller dotted patterns occasionally diagonally intersect. The underbelly is off-white.

Geographic range
The snake is found in China including Hong Kong and Hainan, Japan including Ryukyu Islands, mostly Okinawa, Miyako and Yaeyama, Taiwan, and northern Vietnam.

References 

formosanus
Snakes of China
Snakes of Vietnam
Snakes of Asia
Reptiles of Hong Kong
Reptiles of Japan
Reptiles of Taiwan
Reptiles of Vietnam
Reptiles described in 1872
Taxa named by Albert Günther